Panayikulam is a small village which falls in the Alangad Grama Panchayat, Paravur Taluk, Kerala, India. It is just near to Aluva town. A nice place to live in, easily accessible to Aluva Railway Station at 7 km, Nedumbassery International Airport 10 km and the Kochi City at 15 km.  It is a preferred residential locality due to its proximity to the industrial areas, viz Binanipuram, Eloor and Kalamassery, where major factories like FACT, HMT, HIL, TCC, Binani, CMRL etc., are situated.  Can commute on daily basis to the InfoPark, Kochi which is almost 12 km away.  The place is providing its residents with pure water with no salinity in it and plain beautiful land very close to the Periyar River.It is the birthplace of film director/actor Althaf Salim

The people here mainly rely on agriculture.  Panayikulam is well known for the cultivation of Snap Melon (Pottuvellari).  Panayikulam is home to a lot of Non Resident Indians.

Education

Government LP School, Little Flower High School, Alhuda School and Viswadeepti Vidyalaya are the institutions, the village depend for their primary education.  After school students has accessibility to other educational institutions like Union Christian College, St. Xavier's College for Women, Cochin University of Science and Technology, MES College Marampally, St.Puls College etc.

Religious spots

Little Flower Church, Panayikulam Juma Masjid, Salafi Masgid Panayikulam, Marayil Temple, Mahavishnu Temple, Al Huda Masjid , Panayikulam Central Masjid. 
Panaikulam is the nearest bus route to visit Kunnel Palli (Infant Jesus Church).

Nearby places

 Kadungalloor
 Eloor
 Binanipuram
 Kalamassery
 Alangad
 Koonammavu
 Varapuzha
 Aluva Town

Landmarks

 Dhanya Auditorium 
 Little Flower Church 
PKM LFHS

Bus routes

 Ernakulam- Kalamassery- Panayikulam-Koonammavu - North Paravur
 Aluva -Kadungallor-Panayikulam-Koonammavu-Varapuzha
 Koonammavu-Panayikulam-Kalamassery(Seaport-Airport Road)-Kakkanad
 North Paravur- Koonammavu- Panayikulam- Kalamassery HMT- Govt.Cochin Medical College, Kalamassery.

Bus stops

Karippuzha
Narayanan Kada
Nalam Mile
Panayikulam 
Millu Padi
Puthiya road
Pallippady
Chirayam ration kada
Keeranpilly

Taxi stands

Panayikulam Kavala
Puthiya Road
 Kongorpilly

See also
North Paravur
Ernakulam District

References 

Villages in Ernakulam district
Suburbs of Kochi